Nattrassia is a genus of fungi in the family Botryosphaeriaceae for which there is the single species Nattrassia mangiferae. More recently this species has been reclassified into the family Neofusicoccum as Neofusicoccum mangiferae.

External links
 Index Fungorum

Botryosphaeriaceae
Monotypic Ascomycota genera